Mistake Mistake Mistake Mistake is an album by James Figurine, released in 2006 under the Plug Research record label. It includes ten tracks.

Track listing
 "55566688833"
 "Leftovers"
 "Ruining The Sundays"
 "Pretend It's a Race and I'm on Your Side"
 "You Again"
 "Apologies"
 "One More Regret"
 "White Ducks"
 "All the Way to China" (featuring Erlend Øye on vocals)
 "Stop"

References

External links
Mistake Mistake Mistake Mistake at Plug Research

Dntel albums
Plug Research albums
2006 albums